Vilniaus viešasis transportas may refer to:

Trolleybuses in Vilnius
Vilniaus autobusai